The Ferrari F8 (Type F142MFL) is a mid-engine sports car produced by the Italian automobile manufacturer Ferrari. The car is the replacement to the Ferrari 488, with exterior and performance changes. It was unveiled at the 2019 Geneva Motor Show.

Variants

F8 Tributo

Specifications and performance 
The exhaust layout and the Inconel manifolds have been completely modified up to the terminals. The F8 Tributo also uses turbo rev sensors, developed in the 488 Challenge, to maximise the efficiency of the turbochargers based on the demand for power from the pedal. The transmission is a 7-speed dual clutch automatic unit with improved gear ratios.

Several new software features are installed on the F8 which are controlled via the manettino dial on the steering wheel. The car is equipped with Ferrari's latest Side Slip Angle Control traction- and stability-control program. Additionally, the Ferrari Dynamic Enhancer, an electronic program for managing drifts, can now be used in the Race drive mode. Ferrari also stated that the Tributo's downforce has been increased by 15 percent as compared to the 488 GTB. Road & Track tested a US-spec Ferrari F8 Tributo model and achieved an 10.3-second quarter-mile time with a  trap speed, which equates to 0–100 km/h in the mid-3 range and 0–200 km/h in the low-10 range.

Aerodynamics
The car also features quad taillamps, a feature that was last seen in the V8 lineage on the F430. At the rear, it sports a louvered clear engine cover made from lightweight Lexan which pays homage to the F40 and a wrap-around rear spoiler inspired by the 308 GTB, with additional air intakes on both sides.

Interior
The interior has received updates as well: the dashboard, instrument housing, and door panels are new. The two-tone colour scheme seen on the 488 has also been replaced. An 8.5 inch passenger touchscreen display is also standard as a part of the HMI (Human Machine Interface).

F8 Spider
The F8 Spider is an open-top variant of the F8 Tributo with a folding hardtop as seen on its predecessors.

The Spider's drivetrain is shared with the Tributo.

One-offs

SP48 Unica
The SP48 Unica enhances a new unique design like its name in a mechanics derived from the F8 Tributo including its mid-mounted 710 bhp twin-turbo V8.

References

External links

 Ferrari F8 Tributo - automoto.it (YouTube)

2020s cars
Cars introduced in 2019
F8 Tributo
Rear mid-engine, rear-wheel-drive vehicles
Sports cars